2003–04 Országos Bajnokság I (men's water polo) was the 98th water polo championship in Hungary.

First stage 

Pld - Played; W - Won; L - Lost; PF - Points for; PA - Points against; Diff - Difference; Pts - Points.

Championship Playoff

European competition Playoff

Relegation Playoff

Sources 
Magyar sportévkönyv 2005

Seasons in Hungarian water polo competitions
Hungary
2003 in water polo
2003 in Hungarian sport
2004 in water polo
2004 in Hungarian sport